Sebastian Gemkow (born 27 July 1978) is a German lawyer and politician of the Christian Democratic Union (CDU) who has been serving as State Minister of Science (since 2019) and as State Minister of Justice (2014–2019) in the governments of successive Minister-Presidents Stanislaw Tillich (2014–2018) and Michael Kretschmer (since 2017). Since 2009, he has been a member of the Landtag of the Free State of Saxony, the state's parliament.

Early life and career
From 1998 to 2004, Gemkow studied law at the University of Leipzig, the University of Hamburg und the Humboldt University of Berlin. After he had successfully passed his first government licensing examination in 2004, he worked in Leipzig and also passed the second government licensing examination in 2006. After that, he settled as a lawyer in Leipzig. Until 2014, he also served as honorary consul of Estonia.

Political career
Gemkow has been a member of the Christian Democratic Union since 1998.

Since the 2009 state elections, Gemkow has been a member of the Saxon State Parliament. In the Parliament, he first served as a member of the Committee on Science, Education, Culture and Media.

As one of the state’s representatives at the Bundesrat, Gemkow is a member of the Committee on Legal Affairs. He is also a member of the German-Russian Friendship Group set up by the Bundesrat and the Russian Federation Council.

Gemkow was Saxon Minister of Justice from November 2014 to December 2019. He has been Saxony's Minister of Science since December 2019

In Leipzig’s 2020 local elections, Gemkow won the first round of voting against incumbent mayor Burkhard Jung; however, he eventually lost in the runoff vote.

Other activities 
Since 2010 Gemkow has been the president of the Parliamentary Forum Mittel- und Osteuropa, which is a cross-party organization of the Saxon Parliament's members and responsible representatives of business and society. The goal of the organization is to promote the cooperation between political and administrative actors from Saxony and the Central and Eastern European countries in order to support economic, cultural and social development.

Additional positions include: 
 Deutsches Museum, Member of the Board of Trustees
 Max Planck Institute for Chemical Physics of Solids, Member of the Board of Trustees
 Max Planck Institute for Mathematics in the Sciences, Member of the Board of Trustees
 Max Planck Institute of Molecular Cell Biology and Genetics, Member of the Board of Trustees
 Max Planck Institute for the Physics of Complex Systems, Member of the Board of Trustees

Personal life
Gemkow is Evangelical Lutheran, married and has three children.

References

External links 

 Eigene Homepage

Christian Democratic Union of Germany politicians
1978 births
Living people
Members of the Landtag of Saxony
Ministers of the Saxony State Government
University of Hamburg alumni